Back Long Ago is a 1969 Argentine film directed by Ricardo Becher and written by Guillermo Enrique Hudson, with George Sherry Zabrieskie

The film starred Anna Bradley, Rodolfo López and Cihangir Ghaffari as John Foster.

Cast 
 Cihangir Gaffari
 Anna Bradley
 Rodolfo López
 Kuky Heberbur
 Alfredo Plank
 Barry Van Kleek

References

Bibliography 
 Raúl Manrupe, Maria Alejandra. Un diccionario de films argentinos (1930-1995). Editorial Corregidor, 2001

External links 
 

1969 films
Argentine drama films
Films directed by Ricardo Becher
Unreleased films
Films based on Argentine novels
1960s unfinished films
1960s Argentine films